The 14th World Orienteering Championships were held in Birštonas, Lithuania in July 2017.

Event dates and locations

Results

References 

World Trail Orienteering Championships
2017 in Lithuanian sport
International sports competitions hosted by Lithuania
Orienteering in Europe
Birštonas
July 2017 sports events in Europe
2017 in orienteering